Saint-Laurent-du-Maroni Airport  is an airport serving Saint-Laurent-du-Maroni, a commune of French Guiana. The city is on the Maroni River, the border with Suriname.

Airline and destinations

Statistics

See also

 List of airports in French Guiana
 Transport in French Guiana

References

External links
OpenStreetMap - Saint-Laurent-du-Maroni
OurAirports - Saint-Laurent-du-Maroni Airport
SkyVector - Saint-Laurent-du-Maroni Airport

Airports in French Guiana
Buildings and structures in Saint-Laurent-du-Maroni